Major-General John Hill CB DSO (14 January 1866 – 8 January 1935) was a senior British Indian Army officer during the First World War.

Biography
Born in Bangalore on 14 January 1866, John Hill was educated at Bedford School and at the Royal Military College, Sandhurst. He was commissioned into the Oxfordshire and Buckinghamshire Light Infantry in 1887, subsequently transferring to the 15th Ludhiana Sikhs. He served in Burma and India during the Chin Lushai Expedition, between 1889 and 1890, the Second Miranzai Expedition, in 1891, the Chitral Expedition, in 1895, and the Tirah campaign, between 1897 and 1898.

During the First World War he saw action in the Gallipoli campaign in 1915. He became General Officer Commanding (GOC) 52nd (Lowland) Infantry Division in September 1917 and saw action again, initially in the Sinai and Palestine campaign and then, from April 1918, on the Western Front before handing over his command in September 1918.

Hill was appointed Aide-de-camp to King George V in 1916 and was invested as a Commander of the Order of the British Empire in 1918. He retired in 1920 and died in London on 8 January 1935. Hill Square, part of Tel Aviv's Abattoir Hill is named for him.

References

1866 births
1935 deaths
People educated at Bedford School
Graduates of the Royal Military College, Sandhurst
Indian Army generals of World War I
Companions of the Order of the Bath
British Indian Army generals
Military personnel of British India
Oxfordshire and Buckinghamshire Light Infantry officers
British military personnel of the Tirah campaign